Jim McElreath (February 18, 1928 – May 18, 2017) was an American racing driver in the USAC and CART Championship Car series.

Racing career
Jim began his racing career in 1945 at the age of 17. He raced stock cars in Dallas, Texas. Jim would race in the local Texas bullrings for the next fifteen years while working as a bricklayer. It was in 1960 when he and fellow Texan racer Johnny Rutherford decided to race in the Midwest. Both would eventually find super modified rides in the International Motor Contest Association (IMCA). Jim did well enough that by late-summer 1961 that he was offered a ride by fame car owner Lindsey Hopkins in the Hoosier Hundred, a race at the Indiana State Fairgrounds on the United States Auto Club (USAC) National Championship Trail. He finished third in this race, an impressive start to his Indy Car career.

He raced in the 1961–1983 seasons, with 178 combined career starts, including 15 in the Indianapolis 500 in 1962–1970, 1973–1974, and 1977–1980.  He finished 48 times in the top 5, with five victories. He was runner-up in the 1966 championship and third in 1963, 1965, and 1970.  In 1962 he was named Indianapolis 500 Rookie of the Year, a result of his 6th-place finish.

Jim won the inaugural California 500 at Ontario, California on September 6, 1970, driving A.J. Foyt's team car.  He battled with Art Pollard for the last 10 laps after Al Unser and Cale Yarborough retired with mechanical issues.

Award
McElreath was a 2002 inductee to the National Sprint Car Hall of Fame.

Personal life
Jim's son, James Jr., was killed in a sprint car crash at Winchester in October 1977. James Jr. had attempted to qualify for the 1977 Indy 500 earlier that year. Alongside his father, they were attempting to become the first father and son combination to qualify for the same race. However, James Jr. was too slow to make the field.

Jim's daughter, Shirley, married racing driver Tony Bettenhausen Jr. The couple died when their private plane crashed in Kentucky in February 2000.

Complete USAC Championship Car results

Complete PPG Indy Car World Series results

Indianapolis 500 results

Notes

External links
Driver Database Profile
Jim McElreath Wins Big In Ontario Motor Speedway Debut
Flashback Friday: October 16, 1977. James McElreath Jr's Last Lap
Race car drivers reunite to celebrate Jim McElreath's 85th birthday

1928 births
2017 deaths
Indianapolis 500 drivers
Indianapolis 500 Rookies of the Year
National Sprint Car Hall of Fame inductees
Racing drivers from Fort Worth, Texas
Racing drivers from Texas
Sportspeople from Arlington, Texas
USAC Silver Crown Series drivers
Dale Coyne Racing drivers